Joseph Hubert Cogels (14 January 1894 – 26 July 1978) was a Belgian sport shooter who competed in the 1920 Summer Olympics. In 1920 he won the silver medal as member of the Belgian team in the team clay pigeons competition.

References

External links
Joseph Cogels' profile at databaseOlympics

1894 births
1978 deaths
Belgian male sport shooters
Olympic shooters of Belgium
Shooters at the 1920 Summer Olympics
Olympic silver medalists for Belgium
Trap and double trap shooters
Olympic medalists in shooting
Medalists at the 1920 Summer Olympics
20th-century Belgian people